Antaretra is a municipality in Madagascar. It belongs to the district of Ifanadiana, which is a part of Vatovavy-Fitovinany Region. The population of the commune was estimated to be approximately 10,000 in 2001 commune census.

Only primary schooling is available. It is also a site of industrial-scale  mining. The majority 97% of the population of the commune are farmers.  The most important crop is rice, while other important products are coffee, lychee and cassava. Services provide employment for 3% of the population.

Roads
Antaretra is situated alongside the National Road 25 that leads from Fianarantsoa to Mananjary.

References 

Populated places in Vatovavy